Elmer Robert Tapper Sr. (June 19, 1929 – September 17, 2011), usually known as E. T. Tapper, was an attorney and a Democratic member of the Louisiana House of Representatives from his native St. Bernard Parish, Louisiana.
 
Tapper was first elected to the House in 1960, with the incoming Jimmie Davis administration. He was unseated in 1964 by fellow Democrat Sammy Nunez. However, he returned to the House in a special election in 1969. In his second stint from 1969 to 1972, Tapper served from a combined St. Bernard and Plaquemines district. From 1972 to 1976, he again represented only St. Bernard Parish. In 1973, Tapper he was a delegate to the Louisiana Constitutional Convention, which produced a new governing document for his state.

The son of Elmer and Sarah Tapper, he was reared in Violet, a census-designated place in St. Bernard Parish and a suburb of New Orleans, where Tapper assisted his father in fishing local lakes and the Gulf of Mexico. He was christened in the Roman Catholic Church. In 1952, he received his law degree from Loyola University New Orleans College of Law. He wed his high school sweetheart, the former Audra Galjour, and then entered the United States Army. Upon discharge from military service as a private, Tapper practiced law for thirty-five years and served a total of eleven years in the legislature, claiming to have represented the interests of "the little guy." From 1976 to 1984, Tapper was the attorney for the Louisiana Pardon Board.
 
In his later years, Tapper and his wife relocated to Everett, Washington, where he died at the age of eighty-two.

References

External links

1929 births
2011 deaths
Democratic Party members of the Louisiana House of Representatives
[[Category:People
 from St. Bernard Parish, Louisiana]]
Politicians from New Orleans
Politicians from Everett, Washington
Loyola University New Orleans College of Law alumni
United States Army soldiers
Lawyers from New Orleans
Catholics from Louisiana
Catholics from Washington (state)
20th-century American lawyers